Sacred Heart Higher Secondary School is a Catholic school in Dwaraka, Wayanad, Kerala, India.

This school was started in 1983 by the Norbertine religious order. Today there are about 1500 students and 75 staff.

References

Catholic secondary schools in India
Premonstratensian Order
Christian schools in Kerala
High schools and secondary schools in Kerala
Schools in Wayanad district
Mananthavady Area
Educational institutions established in 1983
1983 establishments in Kerala